Angelika Slamová (born June 19, 1994) is a Slovak basketball player for Piešťanské Čajky and the Slovak national team.

She participated at the EuroBasket Women 2017.

References

1994 births
Living people
Slovak women's basketball players
Sportspeople from Dunajská Streda
Shooting guards